Belfast is a suburb of Christchurch, New Zealand. It is in the north of the city 10 km from Cathedral Square, close to the banks of the Waimakariri River.

History

Belfast is named after Belfast in Northern Ireland. It was originally known as North Road District, Seven Mile Peg, Styx, or by its Māori name Purarekanui.

James McNeight Watt (1838–1892) emigrated from Belfast and was a partner with the original meat works, around which the settlement grew. Watt, who developed much of the area, is believed to have given it its present name.

Demographics

Belfast had a population of 4,218 at the 2018 New Zealand census, an increase of 318 people (8.2%) since the 2013 census, and an increase of 549 people (15.0%) since the 2006 census. There were 1,632 households. There were 2,091 males and 2,124 females, giving a sex ratio of 0.98 males per female, with 759 people (18.0%) aged under 15 years, 801 (19.0%) aged 15 to 29, 1,956 (46.4%) aged 30 to 64, and 705 (16.7%) aged 65 or older.

Ethnicities were 86.8% European/Pākehā, 11.7% Māori, 2.5% Pacific peoples, 6.4% Asian, and 2.9% other ethnicities (totals add to more than 100% since people could identify with multiple ethnicities).

The proportion of people born overseas was 17.0%, compared with 27.1% nationally.

Although some people objected to giving their religion, 54.5% had no religion, 33.4% were Christian, 1.1% were Hindu, 0.4% were Muslim, 0.7% were Buddhist and 2.5% had other religions.

Of those at least 15 years old, 441 (12.7%) people had a bachelor or higher degree, and 855 (24.7%) people had no formal qualifications. The employment status of those at least 15 was that 1,812 (52.4%) people were employed full-time, 492 (14.2%) were part-time, and 129 (3.7%) were unemployed.

Economy

Belfast has a freezing works. The nearest shopping complex is at Northwood Supa Centre.

Education
Belfast School is a contributing primary school catering for years 1 to 8.

Sport

Belfast is home to the Belfast Rugby Club, which competes in the Christchurch rugby competition. The team's colours are green and gold. Its main sports ground is Sheldon Park. The northern end of the suburb houses light industry.

Notable people from Belfast
 Shane Bond (Former player for New Zealand Black Caps cricket team)
 Bill Bush (former All-Black) Now President Belfast Rugby Club (Cobras)
 Craig Green (former All Black)
 Jamie Nutbrown Former Canterbury Crusaders halfback, also a former Super Rugby referee.
 Wayne Smith (All Black's assistant coach)
 Mabel Whitaker (1884–1976), teacher and local historian.

References

Suburbs of Christchurch
Populated places in Canterbury, New Zealand